This is a list of players who scored over 100 goals in Serie A, Italy's top flight football league, during its history starting from the 1929–30 season. Giuseppe Meazza was the first player to reach both 100 and 200 goals in Serie A. Since the 1948–49 Serie A season, Silvio Piola has headed the list. The most recent player to score their hundredth goal in Serie A was Edin Dzeko.

List
Key
 Bold shows players still playing in Serie A.
 Italics show players still playing professional football in other leagues.
 This list does not include goals scored during 1944 Campionato Alta Italia and the 1945–46 Serie A-B.

{| class="wikitable sortable" style="text-align:center"
! scope="col" |Rank
! scope="col" width=175px|Player
! scope="col" |Goals
! scope="col" |
! scope="col" |
! scope="col" |
! scope="col" |
! class="unsortable" |
! class="unsortable"|Notes
|-
|1
|style="text-align:left" data-sort-value="Piola, Silvio"| Silvio Piola
|274
|537
|
|1929
|1954
|style="text-align:left"|, 
|
|-
|2
|style="text-align:left" data-sort-value="Totti, Francesco"| Francesco Totti
|250
|619
|
|1992
|2017
|style="text-align:left"|Roma
|
|-
|3
|style="text-align:left" data-sort-value="Nordahl, Gunnar"| Gunnar Nordahl
|225
|291
|
|1949
|1958
|style="text-align:left"|, 
|
|-
|rowspan="2" |4
|style="text-align:left" data-sort-value="Meazza, Giuseppe"| Giuseppe Meazza
|216
|367
|
|1929
|1947
|style="text-align:left"|, 
|
|-
|style="text-align:left" data-sort-value="Altafini, José"|  José Altafini
|216
|459
|
|1958
|1976
|style="text-align:left"|, 
|
|-
|6
|style="text-align:left" data-sort-value="Di Natale, Antonio"| Antonio Di Natale
|209
|445
|
|2002
|2016
|style="text-align:left"|, 
|
|-
|7
|style="text-align:left" data-sort-value="Baggio, Roberto"| Roberto Baggio
|205
|452
|
|1985
|2004
|style="text-align:left"|, 
|
|-
|8
|style="text-align:left" data-sort-value="Immobile, Ciro"| Ciro Immobile
|191
|311
|
|2009
|2023
|style="text-align:left"|, 
|
|-
|9
|style="text-align:left" data-sort-value="Hamrin, Kurt"| Kurt Hamrin
|190
|400
|
|1956
|1971
|style="text-align:left"|, 
|
|-
|rowspan="3"|10
|style="text-align:left" data-sort-value="Signori, Giuseppe"| Giuseppe Signori
|188
|344
|
|1991
|2004
|style="text-align:left"|, 
|
|-
|style="text-align:left" data-sort-value="Del Piero, Alessandro"| Alessandro Del Piero
|188
|478
|
|1993
|2012
|style="text-align:left"|Juventus
|
|-
|style="text-align:left" data-sort-value="Gilardino, Alberto"| Alberto Gilardino
|188
|514
|
|1999
|2017
|style="text-align:left"|, 
|
|-
|13
|style="text-align:left" data-sort-value="Batistuta, Gabriel"| Gabriel Batistuta
|183
|318
|
|1991
|2003
|style="text-align:left"|, 
|
|-
|14
|style="text-align:left" data-sort-value="Quagliarella, Fabio"| Fabio Quagliarella
|181
|550
|
|1999
|2023
|style="text-align:left"|, 
|
|-
|15
|style="text-align:left" data-sort-value="Boniperti, Giampiero"| Giampiero Boniperti
|178
|443
|
|1946
|1961
|style="text-align:left"|Juventus
|
|-
|16
|style="text-align:left" data-sort-value="Amadei, Amedeo"| Amedeo Amadei
|174
|423
|
|1936
|1956
|style="text-align:left"|, 
|
|-
|17
|style="text-align:left" data-sort-value="Savoldi, Giuseppe"| Giuseppe Savoldi
|168
|405
|
|1965
|1980
|style="text-align:left"|, 
|
|-
|18
|style="text-align:left" data-sort-value="Gabetto, Guglielmo"| Guglielmo Gabetto
|164
|323
|
|1934
|1949
|style="text-align:left"|, 
|
|-
|19
|style="text-align:left" data-sort-value="Boninsegna, Roberto"| Roberto Boninsegna
|162
|363
|
|1965
|1979
|style="text-align:left"|, 
|
|-
|20
|style="text-align:left" data-sort-value="Toni, Luca"| Luca Toni
|157
|344
|
|2000
|2016
|style="text-align:left"|, 
|
|-
|rowspan="4"|21
|style="text-align:left" data-sort-value="Ibrahimović, Zlatan"| Zlatan Ibrahimović
|156
|283
|
|2004
|2023
|style="text-align:left"|, 
|
|-
|style="text-align:left" data-sort-value="Riva, Gigi"| Gigi Riva
|156
|289
|
|1964
|1976
|style="text-align:left"|Cagliari
|
|-
|style="text-align:left" data-sort-value="Inzaghi, Filippo"| Filippo Inzaghi
|156
|370
|
|1995
|2012
|style="text-align:left"|, 
|
|-
|style="text-align:left" data-sort-value="Mancini, Roberto"| Roberto Mancini
|156
|541
|
|1981
|2000
|style="text-align:left"|, 
|
|-
|rowspan="2"|25
|style="text-align:left" data-sort-value="Vinício, Luís"| Luís Vinício
|155
|347
|
|1955
|1968
|style="text-align:left"|, 
|
|-
|style="text-align:left" data-sort-value="Reguzzoni, Carlo"| Carlo Reguzzoni
|155
|401
|
|1929
|1948
|style="text-align:left"|, 
|
|-
|rowspan="2"|27
|style="text-align:left" data-sort-value="Nyers, István"| István Nyers
|153
|237
|
|1948
|1956
|style="text-align:left"|, 
|
|-
|style="text-align:left" data-sort-value="Crespo, Hernán"| Hernán Crespo
|153
|340
|
|1996
|2012
|style="text-align:left"|, 
|
|-
|29
|style="text-align:left" data-sort-value="Bassetto, Adriano"| Adriano Bassetto
|149
|329
|
|1946
|1958
|style="text-align:left"|, 
|
|-
|30
|style="text-align:left" data-sort-value="Sívori, Omar"|  Omar Sívori
|147
|279
|
|1957
|1969
|style="text-align:left"|, 
|
|-
|rowspan="4"|31
|style="text-align:left" data-sort-value="Vieri, Christian"| Christian Vieri
|142
|264
|
|1991
|2009
|style="text-align:left"|, 
|
|-
|style="text-align:left" data-sort-value="Lorenzi, Benito"| Benito Lorenzi
|142
|330
|
|1947
|1959
|style="text-align:left"|, 
|
|-
|style="text-align:left" data-sort-value="Di Vaio, Marco"| Marco Di Vaio
|142
|342
|
|1994
|2012
|style="text-align:left"|, 
|
|-
|style="text-align:left" data-sort-value="Pulici, Paolo"| Paolo Pulici
|142
|401
|
|1967
|1985
|style="text-align:left"|, 
|
|-
|35
|style="text-align:left" data-sort-value="Montella, Vincenzo"| Vincenzo Montella
|141
|288
|
|1996
|2009
|style="text-align:left"|, 
|
|-
|36
|style="text-align:left" data-sort-value="Hansen, John"| John Hansen
|139
|214
|
|1948
|1955
|style="text-align:left"|, 
|
|-
|37
|style="text-align:left" data-sort-value="Chiesa, Enrico"| Enrico Chiesa
|138
|380
|
|1988
|2008
|style="text-align:left"|, 
|
|-
|38
|style="text-align:left" data-sort-value="Brighenti, Sergio"| Sergio Brighenti
|136
|311
|
|1952
|1965
|style="text-align:left"|, 
|
|-
|39
|style="text-align:left" data-sort-value="Pruzzo, Roberto"| Roberto Pruzzo
|133
|331
|
|1973
|1989
|style="text-align:left"|, 
|
|-
|40
|style="text-align:left" data-sort-value="Altobelli, Alessandro"| Alessandro Altobelli
|132
|337
|
|1977
|1989
|style="text-align:left"|, 
|
|-
|41
|style="text-align:left" data-sort-value="Borel, Felice"| Felice Borel
|131
|257
|
|1932
|1947
|style="text-align:left"|, 
|
|-
|rowspan="2"|42
|style="text-align:left" data-sort-value="Pascutti, Ezio"| Ezio Pascutti
|130
|295
|
|1955
|1969
|style="text-align:left"|Bologna
|
|-
|style="text-align:left" data-sort-value="Graziani, Francesco"| Francesco Graziani
|130
|352
|
|1973
|1987
|style="text-align:left"|, 
|
|-
|44
|style="text-align:left" data-sort-value="Bettega, Roberto"| Roberto Bettega
|129
|321
|
|1970
|1983
|style="text-align:left"|Juventus
|
|-
|45
|style="text-align:left" data-sort-value="Rivera, Gianni"| Gianni Rivera
|128
|524
|
|1958
|1979
|style="text-align:left"|, 
|
|-
|46
|style="text-align:left" data-sort-value="Shevchenko, Andriy"| Andriy Shevchenko
|127
|224
|
|1999
|2009
|style="text-align:left"|Milan
|
|- 
|47
|style="text-align:left" data-sort-value="Higuaín, Gonzalo"| Gonzalo Higuaín
|125
|224
|
|2013
|2020
|style="text-align:left"|, 
|
|-
|48
|style="text-align:left" data-sort-value="Ferraris, Pietro"| Pietro Ferraris II
|124
|469
|
|1929
|1950
|style="text-align:left"|, 
|
|- 
|rowspan="3"|49
|style="text-align:left" data-sort-value="Trezeguet, David"| David Trezeguet
|123
|214
|
|2000
|2010
|style="text-align:left"|Juventus
|
|-
|style="text-align:left" data-sort-value="Vialli, Gianluca"| Gianluca Vialli
|123
|325
|
|1984
|1996
|style="text-align:left"|, 
|
|-
|style="text-align:left" data-sort-value="Burini, Renzo"| Renzo Burini
|123
|329
|
|1947
|1959
|style="text-align:left"|, 
|
|-
|52
|style="text-align:left" data-sort-value="Icardi, Mauro"| Mauro Icardi
|121
|219
|
|2012
|2019
|style="text-align:left"|, 
|
|-
|53
|style="text-align:left" data-sort-value="Lucarelli, Cristiano"| Cristiano Lucarelli
|120
|301
|
|1997
|2012
|style="text-align:left"|, 
|
|-
|54
|style="text-align:left" data-sort-value="Puricelli, Ettore"|  Ettore Puricelli
|119
|212
|
|1938
|1949
|style="text-align:left"|, 
|
|-
|55
|style="text-align:left" data-sort-value="Pivatelli, Gino"| Gino Pivatelli
|118
|255
|
|1953
|1963
|style="text-align:left"|, 
|
|-
|56
|style="text-align:left" data-sort-value="Balbo, Abel"| Abel Balbo
|117
|253
|
|1989
|2002
|style="text-align:left"|, 
|
|-
|57
|style="text-align:left" data-sort-value="Mazzola, Alessandro"| Alessandro Mazzola
|116
|415
|
|1960
|1977
|style="text-align:left"|Internazionale
|
|-
|58
|style="text-align:left" data-sort-value="Pazzini, Giampaolo"| Giampaolo Pazzini
|114
|382
|
|2004
|2020
|style="text-align:left"|, 
|
|-
|rowspan="2"|59
|style="text-align:left" data-sort-value="Mertens, Dries"| Dries Mertens
|113
|295
|
|2013
|2022
|style="text-align:left"|Napoli
|
|-
|style="text-align:left" data-sort-value="Amoruso, Nicola"| Nicola Amoruso
|113
|380
|
|1993
|2010
|style="text-align:left"|, 
|
|-
|rowspan="2"|61
|style="text-align:left" data-sort-value="Cavani, Edinson"| Edinson Cavani
|112
|213
|
|2007
|2013
|style="text-align:left"|, 
|
|-
|style="text-align:left" data-sort-value="Pellissier, Sergio"| Sergio Pellissier
|112
|459
|
|2002
|2019
|style="text-align:left"|Chievo
|
|-
|rowspan="2"|63
|style="text-align:left" data-sort-value="Carapellese, Riccardo"| Riccardo Carapellese
|111
|315
|
|1946
|1957
|style="text-align:left"|, 
|
|-
|style="text-align:left" data-sort-value="Cassano, Antonio"| Antonio Cassano
|111
|399
|
|1999
|2017
|style="text-align:left"|, 
|
|-
|rowspan="4"|65
|style="text-align:left" data-sort-value="Bettini, Lorenzo"| Lorenzo Bettini
|110
|271
|
|1952
|1963
|style="text-align:left"|, 
|
|-
|style="text-align:left" data-sort-value="Galli, Carlo"| Carlo Galli
|110
|305
|
|1949
|1966
|style="text-align:left"|, 
|
|-
|style="text-align:left" data-sort-value="Ferrari, Giovanni"| Giovanni Ferrari
|110
|315
|
|1929
|1942
|style="text-align:left"|, 
|
|-
|style="text-align:left" data-sort-value="Baldini, Giuseppe"| Giuseppe Baldini
|110
|346
|
|1939
|1955
|style="text-align:left"|, 
|
|-
|rowspan="2"|69
|style="text-align:left" data-sort-value="Schiavio, Angelo"| Angelo Schiavio
|109
|179
|
|1929
|1938
|style="text-align:left"|Bologna
|
|-
|style="text-align:left" data-sort-value="Giordano, Bruno"| Bruno Giordano
|109
|317
|
|1975
|1992
|style="text-align:left"|, 
|
|-
|rowspan="2"|71
|style="text-align:left" data-sort-value="Boffi, Aldo"| Aldo Boffi
|108
|163
|
|1936
|1945
|style="text-align:left"|Milan
|
|-
|style="text-align:left" data-sort-value="Firmani, Eddie"|  Eddie Firmani
|108
|194
|
|1955
|1963
|style="text-align:left"|, 
|
|-
|rowspan="4"|73
|style="text-align:left" data-sort-value="Zapata, Duván"| Duván Zapata
|107
|274
|
|2013
|2023
|style="text-align:left"|, 
|
|-
|style="text-align:left" data-sort-value="Da Costa, Dino"|  Dino Da Costa
|107
|281
|
|1955
|1966
|style="text-align:left"|, 
|
|-
|style="text-align:left" data-sort-value="Berardi, Domenico"| Domenico Berardi
|107
|288
|
|2013
|2023
|style="text-align:left"|Sassuolo
|
|-
|style="text-align:left" data-sort-value="Dybala, Paulo"| Paulo Dybala
|107
|291
|
|2012
|2023
|style="text-align:left"|, 
|
|-
|rowspan="2"|77
|style="text-align:left" data-sort-value="Vojak, Antonio"| Antonio Vojak
|106
|208
|
|1929
|1937
|style="text-align:left"|, 
|
|-
|style="text-align:left" data-sort-value="Belotti, Andrea"| Andrea Belotti
|106
|292
|
|2014
|2023
|style="text-align:left"|, 
|
|-
|rowspan="3"|79
|style="text-align:left" data-sort-value="Džeko, Edin"| Edin Džeko
|105
|262
|
|2015
|2023
|style="text-align:left"|, 
|
|-
|style="text-align:left" data-sort-value="Anastasi, Pietro"| Pietro Anastasi
|105
|339
|
|1967
|1981
|style="text-align:left"|, 
|
|-
|style="text-align:left" data-sort-value="Armano, Gino"| Gino Armano
|105
|401
|
|1946
|1959
|style="text-align:left"|, 
|
|-
|82
|style="text-align:left" data-sort-value="Cappello, Gino"| Gino Cappello
|104
|300
|
|1940
|1956
|style="text-align:left"|, 
|
|-
|rowspan="3"|83
|style="text-align:left" data-sort-value="Miccoli, Fabrizio"| Fabrizio Miccoli
|103
|259
|
|2002
|2013
|style="text-align:left"|, 
|
|-
|style="text-align:left" data-sort-value="Mutu, Adrian"| Adrian Mutu
|103
|271
|
|1999
|2012
|style="text-align:left"|, 
|
|-
|style="text-align:left" data-sort-value="Clerici, Sergio"| Sergio Clerici
|103
|335
|
|1960
|1978
|style="text-align:left"|, 
|
|-
|rowspan="3"|86
|style="text-align:left" data-sort-value="Bierhoff, Oliver"| Oliver Bierhoff
|102
|219
|
|1991
|2003
|style="text-align:left"|, 
|
|-
|style="text-align:left" data-sort-value="Rocchi, Tommaso"| Tommaso Rocchi
|102
|322
|
|2002
|2013
|style="text-align:left"|, 
|
|-
|style="text-align:left" data-sort-value="Virdis, Pietro Paolo"| Pietro Paolo Virdis
|102
|365
|
|1974
|1991
|style="text-align:left"|, 
|
|-
|89
|style="text-align:left" data-sort-value="Pandev, Goran"| Goran Pandev
|101
|492
|
|2001
|2022
|style="text-align:left"|, 
|
|-
|rowspan="2"|90
|style="text-align:left" data-sort-value="Prati, Pierino"| Pierino Prati
|100
|233
|
|1966
|1978
|style="text-align:left"|, 
|
|-
|style="text-align:left" data-sort-value="Hamšík, Marek"| Marek Hamšík
|100
|409
|
|2004
|2019
|style="text-align:left"|, 
|
|-

See also

Capocannoniere
Football records and statistics in Italy

Notes 

Serie A
Italy